Sicily Island is a village in Catahoula Parish, Louisiana, United States. The population was 336 at the 2020 census.

Geography
Sicily Island is located in northeastern Catahoula Parish at  (31.846573, -91.658925). U.S. Route 425 passes through the village, leading north  to Winnsboro and southeast  to Natchez, Mississippi. Louisiana State Highway 8 leads southwest  to Harrisonburg, the Catahoula Parish seat.

Despite its name, Sicily Island is not an island; instead, nearby lakes and rivers gave the area a shape early settlers considered reminiscent of the island of Sicily.

History
In the early 1700s, the area that would become Sicily Island was the site of a Natchez settlement. In January 1731, towards the end of the Natchez Revolt, French forces besieged the Natchez fort, compelling the surrender of 45 men and 450 women and children. Although the bulk of the Natchez leaders and warriors escaped, the siege marked the last major engagement of the war.

In 1881, a Jewish agricultural colony was created in Sicily Island with the support of the Am Olam organization. The colony was mostly made up of immigrants from Yelisavetgrad who were fleeing the pogroms that began that same year. By 1882, the colony was completely disbanded as the Mississippi River flooded, destroying most farms.

Demographics

As of the census of 2000, there were 453 people, 197 households, and 110 families residing in the village. The racial makeup of the village was 44.81% White, 54.53% African American, 0.22% from other races, and 0.44% from two or more races. Hispanic or Latino of any race were 0.88% of the population.

There were 197 households, out of which 27.4% had children under the age of 18 living with them, 34.0% were married couples living together, 19.8% had a female householder with no husband present, and 43.7% were non-families. 41.1% of all households were made up of individuals, and 21.3% had someone living alone who was 65 years of age or older. The average household size was 2.30 and the average family size was 3.23.

In the village, the population was spread out, with 30.0% under the age of 18, 7.1% from 18 to 24, 26.5% from 25 to 44, 20.3% from 45 to 64, and 16.1% who were 65 years of age or older. The median age was 36 years. For every 100 females, there were 81.9 males. For every 100 females age 18 and over, there were 82.2 males.

The median income for a household in the village was $14,783, and the median income for a family was $23,036. Males had a median income of $25,750 versus $14,821 for females. The per capita income for the village was $11,972. About 45.5% of families and 47.1% of the population were below the poverty line, including 61.6% of those under age 18 and 12.1% of those age 65 or over.

Notable people
 Cecil R. Blair, Louisiana State Senator from Rapides Parish, grew up in Sicily Island and graduated from Sicily Island High School in 1934.
 S. S. DeWitt, member of the Louisiana House from 1964-1972 from Tensas Parish, was born in Sicily Island and graduated from Sicily Island High School in 1931.
 J.C. "Sonny" Gilbert, cotton planter, former member of both the Louisiana House of Representatives (1972–1976) and the Louisiana State Senate (1960–1972), and former director of Louisiana Department of Wildlife and Fisheries, resided in Sicily Island until his death in 2014.
 Joe Raymond Peace, football coach
 William S. Peck, Jr., member of the Louisiana House of Representatives from 1956 to 1964
 William S. Peck, Sr., member of the Louisiana House from 1920 to 1928
 Sonny Simmons, jazz musician, born in Sicily Island in 1933
Coy Wilton Wynn, news correspondent for Associated Press and Time magazine
 Todd Guice graduated from Sicily Island High School and served as President of the LHSAA.

Photo gallery

References

External links
 Sicily Island Progress Community Progress Site for Sicily Island, LA
 DiscoverCatahoula.com Community Website for Catahoula Parish, LA

Villages in Louisiana
Villages in Catahoula Parish, Louisiana